Tuy Phong is a rural district of Bình Thuận province in the Southeast region of Vietnam. As of 2003, the district had a population of 90,819. The district covers an area of 755 km². The district capital lies at Liên Hương.

References

Districts of Bình Thuận province